Philipis is a genus of beetles in the family Carabidae, containing the following species:

 Philipis agnicapitis Baehr, 1995
 Philipis alpina Baehr, 2007
 Philipis alticola Baehr, 1995
 Philipis alutacea Baehr, 1995
 Philipis atra Baehr, 1995
 Philipis bicolor Baehr, 1995
 Philipis castanea Baehr, 1995
 Philipis cooki Baehr, 1995
 Philipis distinguenda Baehr, 1995
 Philipis ellioti Baehr, 1995
 Philipis frerei Baehr, 1995
 Philipis geoffreyi Baehr, 1995
 Philipis heatherae Baehr, 1995
 Philipis inermis Baehr, 1995
 Philipis inexspectata Baehr, 2002
 Philipis laevigata Baehr, 1995
 Philipis laevis Baehr, 1995
 Philipis lawrencei Baehr, 2007
 Philipis lustrans Baehr, 1995
 Philipis minor Baehr, 1995
 Philipis perstriata Baehr, 1995
 Philipis picea Baehr, 1995
 Philipis picta Baehr, 1995
 Philipis planicola Baehr, 1995
 Philipis quadraticollis Baehr, 1995
 Philipis reticulata Baehr, 1995
 Philipis rufescens Baehr, 1995
 Philipis ruficollis Baehr, 1995
 Philipis sinuata Baehr, 1995
 Philipis spurgeoni Baehr, 1995
 Philipis striata Baehr, 1995
 Philipis striatoides Baehr, 2002
 Philipis subtropica Baehr, 1995
 Philipis sulcata Baehr, 1995
 Philipis thompsoni Baehr, 1995
 Philipis tribulationis Baehr, 1995
 Philipis trunci (Darlington, 1963)
 Philipis unicolor Baehr, 1995
 Philipis unistriata Baehr, 2002
 Philipis vicina Baehr, 1995
 Philipis weiri Baehr, 2007

References

Trechinae